TKO may refer to:

Sports
 Technical knockout, a professional fighting term
 Total Knock Out, a professional wrestling move

Music

Artists
 TKO (band), a rock band from Seattle, Washington
 TKO, a pop group led by Katie White

Albums
TKO (Tsakani Mhinga album), 2000
TKO (The Knock Out), 2018 album by Mýa
TKO, album by Kelly Khumalo, 2005

Songs
 "TKO" (Justin Timberlake song)
 "TKO" (Le Tigre song)
 "TKO" (Motion City Soundtrack song)
 "T.K.O." (Giant Panda song)
 "TKO", from Bassnectar's Unlimited
 "TKO", from Jesse Malin's The Fine Art of Self Destruction
 "TKO", from the Sam & Max Season Two Soundtrack
 "TKO", from the 1983 debut album Love Wars by Womack & Womack
 "T.K.O. (Boxing Day)", from Elvis Costello's Punch the Clock
 "T.K.O.", from Dave Grusin's Migration

Film and TV
 "TKO" (Babylon 5), an episode of the TV series Babylon 5
 T.K.O. (film), a 2007 film starring Dianna Agron
 The Kill Order, the prequel novel to The Maze Runner series
 Three Kingdoms Online, a browser based strategy game 
 TKO: Total Knock Out, an obstacle course reality TV game show
 T.K.O., an OK K.O.! Let's Be Heroes character

Technology
 Taylor KO Factor, a measurement of the stopping power of a firearms cartridge
 TKO Software, a defunct software company
 Triple knockout, in molecular biology
 "To keep open", a medical acronym for an intravenous drip that is flowing just enough to keep the IV open for future use (sometimes written as KVO - "keep vein open")

Other uses
 The Kindness Offensive, a North London group known for random acts of kindness
 Tseung Kwan O, a new town in Hong Kong
 MTR station code for Tseung Kwan O station
 Station code for Taman Kota railway station
 TKO Studios, a comics publisher
 Tie extractor/inserter, a railroad maintenance vehicle

See also
 KO (disambiguation)
 Knockout (disambiguation)